Leptodeira polysticta, the small-spotted cat-eyed snake, is a species of snake in the family Colubridae.  The species is native to Mexico, Guatemala, Belize, El Salvador, Nicaragua, and Costa Rica.

References

Leptodeira
Snakes of Central America
Reptiles of Mexico
Reptiles of Guatemala
Reptiles of Belize
Reptiles of El Salvador
Reptiles of Nicaragua
Reptiles of Costa Rica
Reptiles described in 1895
Taxa named by Albert Günther